Uptown is a primarily residential neighborhood of the city of New Orleans.  A subdistrict of the Uptown/Carrollton Area, its boundaries as defined by the New Orleans City Planning Commission are: LaSalle Street to the north, Napoleon Avenue to the east, Magazine Street to the south and Jefferson Avenue to the west.

Geography

Adjacent Neighborhoods
 Freret (north)
 Milan (east)
 Touro (east)
 West Riverside (south)
 Audubon (west)

Boundaries
The New Orleans City Planning Commission defines the boundaries of Uptown as these streets: LaSalle Street, Napoleon Avenue, Magazine Street and Jefferson Avenue. Uptown New Orleans is colloquially used to describe a number of neighborhoods between the French Quarter and Jefferson Parish line.

Demographics
As of the census of 2000, there were 6,681 people, 3,233 households, and 1,446 families living in the neighborhood.  The population density was 10,439 /mi2 (3,930 /km2).

As of the census of 2010, there were 5,984 people, 2,921 households, and 1,252 families living in the neighborhood.

Notable people
 Jennifer Sneed Heebe, former state representative and Jefferson Parish council member, Uptown resident since 2008
 Peggy Wilson, former member of the New Orleans City Council, raised in Uptown

See also
 New Orleans neighborhoods
 Uptown New Orleans

References

Neighborhoods in New Orleans